The GPD Win 3 is a Windows-based handheld computer that is the successor to the GPD Win 2 and GPD Win MAX. It is manufactured by Chinese company Gamepad Digital (GPD), and crowdfunded.

Specifications

History 
Following the GPD Win 2 in 2017 and GPD Win Max in 2020, GPD announced the GPD Win 3.

The Indiegogo campaign started in January 2021 and ended in March 2021.

Performance 
The GPD Win 3 can run Fallout 4 at 720p60 or 1080p30 with Ultra settings

The I7-1165G7 (28W) have same performance as I7-8700H in multi-thread and 20-45% better performance in single thread.

See also 

 Comparison of handheld game consoles
 GPD Win
 GPD Win 2
 GPD XD
 PC gaming
 Handheld game console

References

External links 
  (English)
  (中文)

Handheld personal computers
Indiegogo projects
Windows 10